Marsh Creek is a  tributary of the Monocacy River in south-central Pennsylvania and north-central Maryland in the United States.

Marsh Creek and Rock Creek join below Gettysburg and the Gettysburg Battlefield to form the Monocacy River. The height of land between Marsh and Rock creeks is the site of the Battle of Gettysburg.

See also
List of rivers of Maryland
List of rivers of Pennsylvania

References

External links
U.S. Geological Survey: PA stream gaging stations

Rivers of Maryland
Rivers of Pennsylvania
Rivers of Frederick County, Maryland
Rivers of Adams County, Pennsylvania
Tributaries of the Monocacy River